Sydney Phillip Greve (9 September 1925 – 7 December 2015) was a Pakistani boxer. He competed at the 1948 Summer Olympics and the 1952 Summer Olympics. At the 1948 Summer Olympics, he lost to Dennis Shepherd of South Africa.

References

1925 births
2015 deaths
Featherweight boxers
Pakistani male boxers
Olympic boxers of Pakistan
Boxers at the 1948 Summer Olympics
Boxers at the 1952 Summer Olympics
Place of birth missing
20th-century Pakistani people